I Ching (often spelled I-Ching) is a fictional, blind martial artist published by DC Comics. He first appeared in Wonder Woman #179 (November 1968), and was created by Denny O'Neil and Mike Sekowsky. The character was created to further the editorial plans to reboot Wonder Woman's premise and characters.

Fictional character biography

Pre-Crisis
I Ching is the last surviving member of an ancient sect, whose monastery was hidden high in the mountains. Their task was to maintain ageless knowledge lost centuries past - a time when men concluded that magic and science are different. Only the sect knew that they are two sides of the same coin. The temple contained several precious gems and metals. Desiring this treasure, Doctor Cyber sent agents to raid the temple. During this attack, all members of the temple were murdered with the sole exception of I Ching, who managed to escape with serious injuries.

Around this time, Wonder Woman surrendered her powers to remain in "Man's World" rather than accompany her fellow Amazons when they relocated to another dimension so they could "restore their magic." Now a mod boutique owner, the powerless Diana Prince acquired I Ching as her mentor. Under I Ching's guidance, Diana trained her body as a weapon, learned martial arts and weapons skills, and undertook adventures that encompassed a variety of genres, from espionage to mythology. It is also revealed that I Ching has a daughter, Lu Shan.

I Ching and Diana subsequently help Superman to defeat a malignant other-dimensional duplicate known as the "Sand Superman" in The Sandman Saga (Superman #240-242).

Wonder Woman's powers and traditional costume were restored in 1973 (issue #204). The issue begins with a lunatic sniper gunning down innocent passersby from his rooftop vantage point. A newly married couple driving to their honeymoon destination are among the fatalities and their car crashes into a nearby restaurant where Diana Prince and her mentor I Ching are dining. During the chaos, the sniper fires again and this time he kills I Ching, who dies in the arms of a distraught Diana.

Post-Crisis/"One Year Later"

In Justice League of America #0, Wonder Woman is shown in her white "Diana Prince" outfit during a flashback. It is unknown if her time as a powerless adventurer has been restored in her history, or if I Ching was her mentor.

Later, in Wonder Woman #2, photos are obtained of Wonder Woman training with an Eastern mystic code-named I Ching. In the photos (presumably obtained during the one-year gap), Wonder Woman is in her white "Diana Prince" outfit.

In Detective Comics #838, Robin (vol. 2) #169, and Nightwing (vol. 2) #139, I Ching works with Batman against Ra's al Ghul, ultimately involving himself in Robin and Nightwing's conflict regarding the Lazarus Pit.

I Ching returns to help Batman and Robin defeat Sensei in Batman #705-707.

DC Rebirth
In DC Rebirth, I-Ching appears in New Super-Man #7 as a martial arts instructor in China, whose guidance Kong Kenan, the Super-Man of China, seeks in order to better control his powers. I-Ching introduces Kenan to the Bagua, the eight trigrams that represent the fundamental principals of reality, explaining that each of his powers are organized around it. I-Ching accompanies Kenan on his adventures to provide guidance and develops a close father-son relationship with him. In later issues, he is revealed to be connected to an identical-looking villain named All-Yang, who caused multiple conflicts for Kenan and the Justice League of China, using the disguise of Ching Lung, a villain from Detective Comics #1. It is revealed that I-Ching and All-Yang are twin brothers and All-Yang imprisons I-Ching in the realm of ghosts. Despite being trapped in the realm of ghosts, I-Ching is able to send his consciousness to the "realm of abstraction" when Kenan calls upon him for help against All-Yang. I-Ching recounts his and All-Yang's youths during their training at a monastery. Upon discovering that I-Ching and All-Yang were the living embodiments of yin and yang, respectively, their masters instructed each brother to learn a bit of the other's nature to achieve balance.  All-Yang refused out of arrogance and abandoned his training, forcing I-Ching to embody both yin and yang.  With Kenan's training complete and I-Ching unable to leave the realms of ghosts, I-Ching passes the mantle of yin and yang onto Kenan, who uses his new powers to defeat All-Yang and absorb him into his body. I-Ching's consciousness continues to advise Kenan within the realm of abstraction while All-Yang's consciousness repeatedly attempts to manipulate him. Despite the brothers' warning to not travel between realms, Kenan uses his yin form to travel to the realm of ghosts to rescue his mentor, only to send himself and the entire Justice League of China there instead, where they encounter evil future versions of themselves, including a fully immersed yin and yang version of Kenan called "Perfect-Man". I-Ching appears and rescues his student from Perfect-Man with his own yin and yang abilities. When I-Ching warns Kenan not to rescue him again, Kenan voices his frustration as I-Ching was the only adult figure in his life who never lied to him nor tried to manipulate him.  I-Ching tells Kenan to "let go of the goodness that can never be and embrace the goodness that is" and sends him and his friends back to the realm of humans.

References

External links

Superman - The Sandman Saga
The Diana Prince Era (Fanzing.com) 
The Unofficial I Ching Chronology

Comics characters introduced in 1968
Fictional blind characters
Fictional male martial artists
DC Comics martial artists
DC Comics male superheroes
Wonder Woman characters
Characters created by Dennis O'Neil
Characters created by Mike Sekowsky
Fictional Buddhist monks
Chinese superheroes